Salted lamb may refer to:

Pastrmajlija 
Salt marsh lamb the meat of sheep grazed on salt marshes in coastal estuaries where they feed on salt-tolerant grasses and herbs 
Agneau de pré-salé, Salt marsh lamb from France
In Iceland a salted lamb and pea soup is traditional